Qalibaf or Qali Baf may refer to:

People
 Mohammad-Bagher Ghalibaf, mayor of Tehran

Places
 Qalibaf, Markazi
 Qali Baf, Semnan
 Qalibaf-e Olya, Razavi Khorasan Province
 Qalibaf-e Sofla, Razavi Khorasan Province